Jo Ann Emerson (née Hermann; born September 16, 1950) is an American politician who was the U.S. representative for  from 1996 to 2013. The district consists of Southeast and South Central Missouri and includes the Bootheel, the Lead Belt and the Ozarks. Emerson is a member of the Republican Party. On January 22, 2013, Emerson resigned her seat in Congress to become the president and chief executive officer of the National Rural Electric Cooperative Association. She served as CEO until August 2015.

With the defeat of Congressman Ike Skelton, Emerson became the dean of Missouri's congressional delegation in 2011.

Early life, education and career
She was born Jo Ann Hermann in Bethesda, Maryland. She was a daughter of Al Hermann, who played for the Boston Braves baseball team from 1923 to 1924 and was executive director of the Republican National Committee. She graduated from Ohio Wesleyan University.

U.S. House of Representatives

Committee assignments
 Committee on Appropriations
 Subcommittee on Agriculture, Rural Development, Food and Drug Administration, and Related Agencies
 Subcommittee on Financial Services and General Government (Chairwoman)
 Subcommittee on the Legislative Branch (Vice Chair)

Other memberships
 Vice President of the NATO Parliamentary Assembly
 Vice Chair of the Subcommittee on Democratic Governance
 Vice Chair of the Center Aisle Caucus
 Honorary and Life Trustee of Westminster College
 Co-chair of the board of directors for the Congressional Hunger Center
 Founding Member of the Bipartisan Congressional Retreat

Emerson, whose voting record in Congress has established her as one of the more moderate Republicans, has a history of bipartisanship while in the U.S. House of Representatives. She was a member of the moderate Republican groups the Republican Main Street Partnership and the Tuesday Group.

On May 24, 2005, Emerson was one of 50 Republicans to vote in favor of overturning President George W. Bush's ban on federal funding for embryonic stem cell research. She cast her "yea" vote the day after her mother-in-law died from Alzheimer's disease, one of the illnesses for which scientists believe they can create better treatments from stem cell research.

On July 12, 2007, Emerson was one of only four Republicans in the U.S. House of Representatives who voted to withdraw U.S. troops from Iraq by April 2008.

On September 15, 2009, Emerson was one of seven House Republicans to vote in favor of the Democrats' proposed resolution to condemn U.S. Representative Joe Wilson (R-South Carolina) for shouting "You lie!" in the middle of President Barack Obama's joint address to the U.S. Congress on health care reform.

Her margins of victory in the district have always been higher than those of GOP presidential candidates George W. Bush and John McCain as well as Republican gubernatorial candidates Kenny Hulshof, Matt Blunt and Jim Talent.

Emerson announced in early December 2012 her plans to retire from Congress in February 2013 to assume a position with the National Rural Electric Cooperative Association  (NRECA) as its president and chief executive officer.

Political campaigns
When her husband Bill died in 1996, Jo Ann announced she would run for his vacant seat.  However, Missouri state law prohibited her from filing in the Republican primary for the general election. She thus had her party membership suspended. In November, Jo Ann Emerson competed in two elections on the same day. She ran as a Republican against Democrat Emily Firebaugh in the special election to finish the last two months of her late husband's eighth term, and as an independent against Democrat Firebaugh and Republican Richard Kline in the general election for a full two-year term. She won both elections easily, and was then reelected seven times without serious difficulty. She is the first Republican woman elected to the U.S. Congress from Missouri. She served the last two months of her husband's term as a Republican, then as an independent caucusing with the Republicans before officially becoming a Republican again at the onset of the new Congress in 1997. She was briefly the first independent elected to federal office in Missouri in 122 years and is the first, and so far only, woman to be elected and serve in Congress as an independent or third party member.

Post-political career
In August 2015, Emerson took a leave of absence from the NRECA for medical reasons and was succeeded by her former congressional chief of staff and chief operating officer, Jeffrey Connor, in an interim capacity in November, effectively stepping down. In June 2016, fellow former U.S. House colleague Jim Matheson was named to succeed Emerson as CEO and took over her post in July. In March 2017, Emerson received the Clyde T. Ellis Award, the highest honor bestowed on an individual by America's electric cooperatives. On her behalf, her husband, Ron Gladney, accepted the award.

Personal life
Hermann married future U.S. Representative Bill Emerson, a Republican from Cape Girardeau, on June 22, 1975. They had two daughters; Jo Ann also has five stepdaughters and a stepson. Bill was elected to the U.S. Congress in 1980 from Missouri's 10th Congressional District and, subsequent to redistricting, was reelected in 1982 from the 8th District. He died from cancer on June 22, 1996, a few months before the end of his eighth term. The Bill Emerson Memorial Bridge, which links Missouri to Illinois across the Mississippi River, was dedicated to commemorate his efforts to obtain federal funding for its construction.

Following Bill's death, Jo Ann married Ron Gladney in 2000. From this marriage she gained two stepdaughters and a stepson.

In 2015, Emerson had a stroke, leaving her paralyzed from the neck down. In April 2020, while living in a retirement community in Washington, D.C., she tested positive COVID-19 amid the pandemic.

Electoral history

See also
 Women in the United States House of Representatives

References

External links
 U.S. Congressman Jo Ann Emerson official U.S. House website
 Jo Ann Emerson official campaign website
 
 

|-

|-

1950 births
20th-century American politicians
20th-century American women politicians
21st-century American politicians
21st-century American women politicians
American politicians with disabilities
Female members of the United States House of Representatives
Independent members of the United States House of Representatives
Living people
Missouri Independents
Ohio Wesleyan University alumni
People from Bethesda, Maryland
People with tetraplegia
Republican Party members of the United States House of Representatives from Missouri
Women in Missouri politics
Members of Congress who became lobbyists